Aliidiomarina sedimenti is a Gram-negative, moderately halophilic, alkaliphilic and motile bacterium from the genus of Aliidiomarina which has been isolated from wetland of Gomishan in Iran.

References

External links
Type strain of Aliidiomarina sedimenti at BacDive -  the Bacterial Diversity Metadatabase

Bacteria described in 2017
Alteromonadales